The OMX Iceland 15 (formerly the ICEX15) is a defunct stock market index which consisted of a maximum of 15 companies listed on the OMX Iceland Stock Exchange with the highest market capitalization. At the final official review of the index effective in January 2009, 12 companies made up the index, four of which were Faroese. Calculated daily since 1998 and starting at 1,000 points, it was a market value-weighted index and the constituent companies were reviewed twice a year.

Over the year 2008 and over the entire decade 1998–2008 the OMX Iceland 15 was the worst performing stock index in the world, being heavily affected by the 2008 Icelandic financial crisis which saw a number of index constituents become insolvent, be nationalised or opt to delist from the exchange. The index was discontinued in July 2009 and replaced by the OMX Iceland 6 as the exchange's benchmark stock index, which had run concurrently for the previous six months.

2008 decline

OMX Iceland 15 suffered a great loss during the financial crisis in 2008. Trading in the stock market was suspended for three successive trading days, October 9, October 10, and October 13. Trading was resumed on October 14, 2008, and OMX Iceland 15 closed at 678.4, which corresponds to a fall of about 77% compared with its close at 3,004.6 on October 8, 2008. This reflected the fact that the value of the three big banks (Glitnir, Kaupthing Bank and Landsbanki Íslands) which formed 73.2 percent of the value of the OMX Iceland 15, had been set to zero.

Final composition
The index consisted of the following companies at the final index reshuffle effective on 2 January 2009. Both Straumur and SPRON were delisted from the exchange before the index's retirement six months later.

References

Economy of Iceland
European stock market indices
Nasdaq Nordic